Ryan Molloy (born 21 November 1972) is a British singer, songwriter and actor, who replaced Holly Johnson as the lead singer in Frankie Goes to Hollywood for a charity concert in 2004. He has also been successful in musical theatre, appearing in a number of hit musicals in the UK and most recently as a headliner for Royal Caribbean International.

Early life and education 
Originally from North Shields in Tyneside, he attended Monkseaton High School. He left high school at the age of 16 in 1989. Molloy later moved to London to train as an actor. He attended The Poor School; and later also trained at the University of California, Los Angeles and New York City.

Career 
He began his musical career in the late 1990s, singing with a number of bands, including Ultra, supporting Jamiroquai and The Lighthouse Family.

He appeared in a number of dramatic roles, including London productions of Shakespeare's The Merchant of Venice and Macbeth. In 2004, he gained a chorus role in the controversial production of Jerry Springer – The Opera. Molloy was a member of the original cast at the National Theatre, and went on to play the parts of the transvestite Tremont and the Angel Gabriel, for which he gained an Olivier Award for Best Supporting Actor. He also starred in the West End hit Taboo, playing Steve Strange alongside Boy George and Lyn Paul.

In October 2004 Molloy was chosen from 200 candidates as the new lead singer of Frankie Goes to Hollywood, appearing in a special charity show for The Prince’s Trust at Wembley Arena, and on their subsequent tour.

An established songwriter as well as singer and actor, he spent some time in 2005 working with Dave Stewart of Eurythmics on the spoof documentary Platinum Weird, which also involved Christina Aguilera, Gwen Stefani and Carmen Electra. He has also written new songs for Frankie Goes to Hollywood.

In 2006 Molloy starred in the role of Stuart in the touring production of Ben Elton's Rod Stewart musical, Tonight's The Night. He also appeared at Jools Hollands' Jam House Club for the Edinburgh Festival in August 2006, together with his band Suntan.

In October 2007, Molloy was cast as Frankie Valli in the West End premiere of Jersey Boys at the Prince Edward Theatre, and played his first performance on 28 February 2008. Later that same year, on 31 December, Molloy appeared on The Weakest Link West End Special, and was the fifth contestant voted off. He remained with Jersey Boys for six years, leaving in March 2014, making him the longest-running star in a West End musical. Molloy also provided vocals in the soundtrack of the film version of the musical. He reprised the role in the Broadway production for a limited engagement lasting from July to October 2014.

In September 2017, Molloy took part in the Great North Run.

References

External links 
  
 
 BBC news article, 31 October 2004
 Interview with The Northern Echo, May 2006
 Ryan Molloy – Theatrical agent's listing 2006

English male musical theatre actors
Living people
English male singers
English male stage actors
English songwriters
Frankie Goes to Hollywood members
1972 births
British male songwriters